Rhizophyllidaceae is a red algae family in the order Gigartinales.

References

External links
Rhizophyllidaceae at AlgaeBase

 
Red algae families